Aqual or variation, may refer to:

 Aqual, a brand name drug formulation of methaqualone
 AQUAL (A QUAdratic Lagrangian), a theory of gravity
 Aqual, a fictional character from the Japanese tokusatsu TV show Chousei Kantai Sazer-X

See also

 
 Qualification (disambiguation)
 Qual or prelim, an exam